Abdanan is a city located in the south of Ilam Province, Iran. The population of the city was 60,213 in 2016.

Demographics 
The city is populated by Kurds with a Luri minority.

References

Populated places in Abdanan County
Cities in Ilam Province
Articles containing video clips

Kurdish settlements in Ilam Province
Luri settlements in Ilam Province